Carabus vigilax, is a species of ground beetle in the large genus Carabus.

References 

vigilax
Insects described in 1890